The 1924 Columbus Tigers season was their fifth in the league. The team failed to improve on their previous output of 5–4–1, winning only four games. They finished tenth in the league.

Schedule

Standings

References

Columbus Tigers seasons
Columbus Tigers
Columbus Tigers